Eduardo Struvay won his maiden title, beating Paolo Lorenzi 6–3, 4–6, 6–4

Seeds

Draw

Finals

Top half

Bottom half

References
 Main Draw
 Qualifying Draw

Open Bogota - Singles
2015 S